Farung Yuthithum, nicknamed Kwang (born April 6, 1987 in Pathum Thani, Thailand) is a Thai actress, model and beauty pageant titleholder who competed in the Miss Universe 2007 pageant and placed in the Top 15.

Early life
As a first year student from Rajamangala University of Technology Thanyaburi, Yuthithum won her first major pageant title in 2006 when she was named Miss U-League 2006. The pageant is held annually for female university students in Thailand.

Pageantry

On March 24, 2007, she competed in the Miss Thailand Universe pageant held in Bangkok where she won and was crowned by reigning Miss Universe 2006 Zuleyka Rivera of Puerto Rico.  Moreover, she was the tallest winner in the Thai pageant's history.

Yuthithum represented Thailand in the Miss Universe 2007 pageant held in Mexico City, Mexico, where she had made the top fifteen round.  Riyo Mori, Miss Japan was crowned Miss Universe.

Personal life

On December 2, 2018, Yuthithum married Andrian Zahariev, a Bulgarian-Russian businessman. Their daughter was born on January 22, 2020.

Stage and screen credits

Television (Channel 7)

MC
 Online 
 2021 : On Air YouTube:Farung Familia

References

External links
Official site of Miss Thailand Universe 2007

1987 births
Living people
Farung Yuthithum
Farung Yuthithum
Miss Universe 2007 contestants
Farung Yuthithum
Farung Yuthithum
Farung Yuthithum
Farung Yuthithum
Farung Yuthithum
Farung Yuthithum